John Francis Steineger Jr. (September 13, 1924–May 1, 2012) was an American politician, diplomat and attorney who spent nearly three decades in the Kansas State Senate, including serving as Senate minority leader from 1976 to 1988.

Early life
Steineger was born in Kansas City, Kansas. He spent a year at the University of Southern California, but his education was interrupted by World War II; he enlisted in the Navy, serving until 1946. He moved back to Kansas to attend the University of Kansas, and married Margaret Ruth Leisy in 1949; the couple eventually had four children, including Chris Steineger, who followed his father into the Kansas State Senate. From 1950 to 1958, John Steineger served in the United States Foreign Service as a cultural attaché in Germany and Iraq. He returned to Kansas and took up the practice of law, working as a Wyandotte County prosecutor in 1960 and founding his own law firm in 1963.

State Senate
Steineger was elected to the State Senate in 1964, taking office in 1965. He was a Democrat and noted for his environmental conservation efforts, receiving a "Conservation Legislator of the Year" award from the Kansas Wildlife Federation in 1974. He was elected as Senate minority leader in 1976 and held the post for 12 years.

References

External Links
 Kansas Oral History interviews concerning John Steineger

Democratic Party Kansas state senators
20th-century American politicians
Politicians from Kansas City, Kansas
University of Kansas alumni
University of Kansas School of Law alumni
20th-century American diplomats
20th-century American lawyers
Kansas lawyers
District attorneys in Kansas
1924 births
2012 deaths